"I Like It" is a 1991 song by Overweight Pooch featuring CeCe Peniston, who contributed vocals on the record. The single was written by E.L. Linnear and Felipe Delgado (both later involved also in recording the Peniston's debut album Finally), and reached number sixteen in the US Billboard Hot Dance Music/Club Play chart, and number fifty-eight in the UK Singles Chart

Credits and personnel
 Management
 Executive producers – Manny Lehman, Mark Mazzetti
 Recording studios – The Wizard Electric, Glendale, Arizona; Chaton Studios, Phoenix, Arizona (mixing)
 Publishing – Main Lot Music, Wax Museum Music/Productions (BMI)

 Production
 Writers – Felipe Delgado, Elbert Lee Linnear
 Producers – Delgado , David Morales (remix)
 Mixing – Delgado
 Remixing – Morales, Rodney Jackson 
 Engineering – Kellan Fluckiger and Delgado; John Poppo and Otto D'Agnolo  (remix)

 Personnel
 Lead vocals – Tonya Davis (rapping)
 Backing vocals – Cecilia Peniston
 Percussion – Morales (remix)
 Keyboards – Eric Kupper (remix)

Track listings and formats

 7", UK, #AM 847/390 847-7
 "I Like It" (Def Party Radio Mix Edit) - 3:53
 "I Like It" (LP Radio Mix Edit) - 3:40

 MCD, UK, #AMCD 847/390 847-2
 "I Like It" (Def Party Radio Mix Edit) - 3:53
 "I Like It" (Def Party Mix 12") - 7:51
 "I Like It" (Remix Version) - 5:31
 "I Like It" (LP Radio Mix Edit) - 3:40

 12", UK, #AMY 847/390 847-1
 12", UK, Promo, #AMYDJ 847
 "I Like It" (Def Party Radio Mix Edit) - 3:53
 "I Like It" (Def Party Mix 12") - 7:51
 "I Like It" (Spaced Out Dub) - 
 "I Like It" (Remix Instrumental) - 5:48
 "I Like It" (LP Radio Mix Edit) - 3:40
 "I Like It" (Remix Version) - 5:31
 "I Like It" (Factory Mix) - 5:33

 12", US, #75021 2393 1
 12", US, Promo, #75021 2393 1
 "I Like It" (Def Party Mix 12") - 7:51
 "I Like It" (Factory Mix) - 5:33
 "I Like It" (Red Zone Dub) - 5:23
 "I Like It" (Def Party Radio Mix) - 4:37
 "I Like It" (Remix Version) - 5:31
 "I Like It" (Remix Instrumental) - 5:48
 "I Like It" (LP Radio Mix) - 4:39

Charts

Weekly charts

References

General

 Specific

External links

1991 singles
CeCe Peniston songs
1991 songs
Songs written by Felipe Delgado (record producer)
A&M Records singles